Callianax is a genus of small predatory sea snails, marine gastropod molluscs in the subfamily Olivellinae of the family Olividae, the olives.

Species
 Callianax alectona (Duclos, 1835)
 Callianax biplicata (G. B. Sowerby I, 1825)
 Callianax diegensis (Oldroyd, 1921)
 Callianax strigata (Reeve, 1850)

References

External links
 Adams, H. & Adams, A. (1853-1858). The genera of Recent Mollusca; arranged according to their organization. London, van Voorst. Vol. 1: xl + 484 pp.; vol. 2: 661 pp.; vol. 3: 138 pls.

Olivellinae